Locations in Australia with an English name is a list of Australian place names that were originally place names in England later applied in Australia by English emigrants and explorers. It also includes place names where there is a similar place name in England, even if one is not directly derived from the other. For example, Oxley is a place name in England, but Oxley, Queensland is named for the explorer John Oxley rather than the English place. Similarly, Kenilworth is a place name in England, but Kenilworth, Queensland is reportedly named after a novel of that name. In some cases the place name in England is that of a residence or farm, rather than a locality; for example, Hughenden, Queensland is derived from Hughenden Manor in Buckinghamshire.

New South Wales

Barham
Barnes
Barnsley
Belford
Berkeley
Bexhill
Blackheath
Blackwall
Bookham
Branxton
Brocklesby
Caldwell
Camberwell
Camden Park
Chipping Norton
Clarendon
Clifton
Coledale
Croydon
Dalton
Darlington
Epping
Euston
Exeter
Frampton
Gloucester
Gosford
Grafton
Greenwich
Hanwood
Harefield
Ilford
Kendall
Kensington
Liverpool
Manchester Square
Milton
Morpeth
Newcastle
New England
Osborne
Otford
Oxley
Paddington
Penrith
Penrose
Richmond
Rosedale
Stanmore
Stroud
Sydenham
Sydney
Tamworth
Toronto
Tottenham
Wellington
Windsor
Woolwich

Queensland

Amberley
Beaudesert
Blackwall
Croydon
Dalby
Dunwich
Edmonton
Gatton
Hughenden
Ipswich
Isisford
Kenilworth
Milton
Northumberland Islands
Oxley
Paddington
Parkwood
Richmond
Rothwell
Runcorn
Scarborough
Southport
St George
Warwick
Westwood
Winton

South Australia

Brighton
Brinkworth
Burton
Clarendon
Clayton
Copley
Darlington
Dutton
Glossop
Harrogate
Hammond
Hyde Park
Littlehampton
Loxton
Lyndhurst
Malvern
Mount Pleasant
Peterborough
Redhill
Saddleworth
Salisbury
Spalding
Stockport
Stockwell
Wellington
Woodside

Tasmania

Beaconsfield
Bellingham
Bishopsbourne
Blackwall
Bridgenorth
Brighton
Cranbrook
Deddington
Devonport
Exeter
Falmouth
Harford
Kempton
Kettering
Launceston
New Norfolk
Orford
Parkham
Richmond
Sheffield
Sidmouth
Somerset
Westbury
Wiltshire
Wivenhoe
Melton Mowbray

Victoria

Addington
Ascot near Ballarat
Ascot near Bendigo
Beaconsfield
Berwick
Blackburn
Brighton
Burnley
Charlton
Chelsea
Cheltenham
Dartmoor
Dartmouth
Doncaster
Epping
Everton
Exford
Harrow
Hastings
Heywood
Horsham
Inglewood
London Arch
Macclesfield
Malmsbury
Malvern
Melbourne
Merton
Newham
Oxley
Peterborough
Preston
Ringwood
Richmond
Red Hill
Rochester
Rosedale
Stratford
Torquay
Woodside

Western Australia

Beaconsfield
Bunbury
Boddington
Brighton
Carlisle
Caversham
Darlington
Denham
Derby
Exmouth
Highbury
High Wycombe
Inglewood
Northampton
Parkwood
Redcliffe
Scarborough
Spalding
Warwick

See also

 English Australians
 List of place names of Dutch origin in Australia
 Locations in Australia with a Scottish name
 Locations in Australia with a Welsh name

References

English
English
Australia
English-Australian culture